Shedding the Cloak is an outdoor 2001 public artwork by Jerry and Tama Dumlao and Mary Lynn Dominguez, installed along San Diego's Martin Luther King Jr. Promenade, in the U.S. state of California. The work is one of several commemorating Martin Luther King Jr. along the promenade, including Mel Edwards' Breaking of the Chains and Roberto Salas' Dream.

See also
 2001 in art

References

2001 establishments in California
2001 sculptures
Memorials to Martin Luther King Jr.
Monuments and memorials in California
Outdoor sculptures in San Diego